Pleuron may refer to:
 Pleuron (Aetolia), a place in Ancient Greece
 Pleuron (son of Aetolus), a figure in Greek mythology

In arthropod anatomy, a pleuron (πλευρ-όν, genitive: -οῦ, neutral, in Greek) is a sclerite on the side of the carapace. It may also refer to:
 Pleuron (crustacean anatomy), the tergum of a crustacean when it overhangs the insertion of the limb on each side as a free plate
 Pleuron (insect anatomy), the lateral portion of a segment of an insect thorax

See also
Plura (disambiguation)